The third season of Schitt's Creek, a Canadian television sitcom created by Daniel Levy and father Eugene Levy, premiered on January 10, 2017 and concluded on April 4, 2017 on CBC Television. The season aired 13 episodes and saw the return of the characters Johnny Rose, Moira Rose, David Rose & Alexis Rose. It was once again produced by Not a Real Company Productions.

The season saw the return of large majority of the main cast. However, cast member Tim Rozon only appeared as his character Mutt Schitt during one episode, making him a special guest star. In addition, Steve Lund who portrayed Jake during the second season finale, was added amongst the regular cast. Noah Reid was added to the cast as Patrick Brewer, and Robin Duke did not return as Wendy Kurtz.

The series was renewed for a fourth season on March 10, 2017.

Cast and characters

Main 
 Eugene Levy as Johnny Rose
 Catherine O'Hara as Moira Rose
 Dan Levy as David Rose
 Annie Murphy as Alexis Rose
 Jennifer Robertson as Jocelyn Schitt
 Emily Hampshire as Stevie Budd
 Dustin Milligan as Ted Mullens
 Chris Elliott as Roland Schitt

Starring 
 Noah Reid as Patrick Brewer
 Sarah Levy as Twyla Sands
 John Hemphill as Bob Currie
 Karen Robinson as Ronnie Lee
 Steve Lund as Jake
 Rizwan Manji as Ray Butani

Recurring 
 Marilyn Bellfontaine as Gwen Currie

Special Guest Stars 
 Lili Conner as Grace
 François Arnaud as Sebastien Raine
 Tim Rozon as Mutt Schitt
 Sarah Power as Tennessee
 Shakura S'Aida as Lena
 Elizabeth McEachern as Robin
 Jasmin Geljo as Ivan

Episodes

Production

Casting 

The season featured 9 starring roles, including 8 returning cast members from the second season. Tim Rozon who appeared as main cast member during the first two seasons, only returned as a special guest star.

Noah Reid joined the recurring cast as David's business partner and love interest, Patrick Brewer. Reid had never watched the show before he auditioned and was unsure how long the character would be a part of the series.

Release 
The season premiered on January 10, 2017 on an 8:00 pm ET/PT time slot with an encore broadcast at 11:00 pm ET/PT on Pop. The third season was released to home media in Canada on April 11, 2017. However, the season has yet to be released in the United States.

References 

Schitt's Creek
2017 Canadian television seasons